World Cup Skateboarding (WCS), sometimes referred to as World Cup of Skateboarding, is an international skateboarding organization that hosts the  World Championships of Skateboarding series and other skateboard competitions.

Overview
Focusing on the professional skateboarders, the first WCS championship took place in 1994 in Vancouver. Since 1995, WCS has grown the pro tour from 3 events in Canada and Germany to 25 events (in 2008), that encompass Canada, Germany, the United States, Brazil, the Czech Republic, England, France, Spain, Switzerland, Australia, Malaysia. For information on wes events, contact: World Cup Skateboarding P.O. Box 836 Soda Springs, California 95728.

History
WCS grew out the existence of the once thriving National Skateboard Association. Learning from the mistakes that the skateboard industry made during the NSA years, former NSA President and directors, Don & Danielle Bostick have made a commitment to the skaters in developing and directing skateboard competitions around the globe.

Venues
Officially recognized World Cup Skateboarding events have in 2018 taken place at these global venues:
Palm Springs – El Gato Classic
Tallinn – Simple Session
Orange – Girls Combi Pool Classic
Orange – Combi Pool Party
Paris – Far' N High
Prague – Mystic Sk8 Cup
Graz – Graz Skate World Cup
Vigo – O Marisquino
Montreal – Jackalope
Santa Barbara County – Orchid Mini Ramp Holiday
Rotterdam – RTM Skateboard World Cup
Moscow – World Cup Moscow
Breda – World Cup Breda
Orange – Amateur Combi Pool Classic 

Some past venues:
Bondi Beach – Bowl a Rama Bondi
Colorado Springs – Rocky Mountain Rampage
Florianópolis – Skate Generation Brazil
Fortaleza – Ceara World Cup
Lake Forest – GVR
Melbourne – Globe World Cup (this was not part of the World Cup Circuit as of 2006)
Malmö – Ultra Bowl 5
Marseille – Sosh Freestyle Cup Marseille
Münster – Monster Mastership
Montpellier – FISE
Newcastle – Australian Bowlriding Championships
Novo Hamburgo – Qix World Contest
Ocean City, Maryland – Dew Tour Beach Championships
Philadelphia – Gravity Games
Rio de Janeiro – Vert Jam
San Diego – Exposure
San Francisco – Dew Tour SF City Championships
San Jose – Tim Brauch Memorial Comp
São Paulo – Crail
Seoul – Asian X Games
Shepton Mallet – NASS
Toronto – Canadian Open
Vancouver – Slam City Jam
Wellington – Bowl a Rama Wellington

References

External links
Official site of World Cup Skateboarding

Skateboarding competitions